The 1944 NFL Championship Game was the 12th National Football League (NFL) title game, played on December 17 at the Polo Grounds in New York City, with an  attendance of 46,016. The game featured the Green Bay Packers (8–2), champions of the Western Division versus the Eastern Division champion New York Giants (8–1–1).

The Packers were led by longtime head coach Curly Lambeau and its stars were running back Ted Fritsch, end Don Hutson, and quarterback Irv Comp. The Giants were led by head coach Steve Owen, running back Bill Paschal, former Packers quarterback Arnie Herber, and a dominant defense.

The Packers were slight favorites, despite the Giants' 24–0 shutout win four weeks earlier. Prior to the game, the Packers had spent over a week preparing in Charlottesville, Virginia; they had completed their regular season on November 26, while the Giants finished on December 10. If the title game ended in a tie, the teams would share the championship.
           
Green Bay scored two touchdowns in the second quarter then yielded one early in the fourth to win 14–7 for their sixth and final league title under Lambeau, their first since 1939.

The Packers did not return to the championship game for sixteen years, and won the following year in 1961, the first of five titles in seven seasons in the 1960s under head coach Vince Lombardi.

Scoring summary
Sunday, December 17, 1944
Kickoff: 2 p.m. EWT (EDT)

First quarter                                                 
no scoring
Second quarter                                                 
GB – Ted Fritsch 1 run (Don Hutson kick), 7–0 GB
GB – Fritsch 28 pass from Irv Comp (Hutson kick), 14–0 GB
Third quarter                                                 
no scoring
Fourth quarter 
NY – Ward Cuff 1 run (Ken Strong kick), 14–7 GB

Officials
Referee: Ronald Gibbs
Umpire: Carl Brubaker
Head Linesman: Charlie Berry
Field Judge: Eugene Miller 

Players' shares
The players' shares were the highest to date: each Packer player received about $1,500 while each Giant saw about $900.

References

Championship Game
National Football League Championship games
Green Bay Packers postseason
New York Giants postseason
Sports in Manhattan
American football competitions in New York City
NFL Championship Game
NFL Championship Game
1940s in Manhattan
Washington Heights, Manhattan